Wang Qi (born 13 November 1993) is a Chinese footballer currently playing as a goalkeeper for Shaanxi Chang'an Athletic.

Career statistics

Club
.

References

1993 births
Living people
Chinese footballers
Association football goalkeepers
China League One players
China League Two players
Shaanxi Chang'an Athletic F.C. players